Love on the Cloud is a 2014 Chinese romantic comedy film directed by Gu Changwei. It was released on December 24.

Cast
Angelababy
Michael Chen
Zhang Luyi
Cao Lu
Wang Ji
Jiang Ruijia
Ju Hao
Tu Yanni
Jiang Wu
Mao Amin
Song Dongye
Wang Baoqiang
Jiang Wenli
Wang Jiajia
Tong Dawei
Wen Zhang

Reception
The film earned  at the Chinese box office.

Derek Elley of Film Business Asia gave the film a 7 out of 10, saying that a "likeable cast gives an average rom-com/movie satire an unpretentious, fluffy charm."

References

External links
 
 
 

2014 romantic comedy films
Chinese romantic comedy films
Films directed by Gu Changwei
2010s Mandarin-language films